is a Japanese actor, famous for portraying the character Eiji Hino in the 2010 tokusatsu series Kamen Rider OOO.

Filmography

TV series

Films

Discography
Under his character name Eiji Hino, Watanabe performed most of the insert themes for the 2010 tokusatsu series Kamen Rider OOO and the theme for the series' film.

References

External links
Official website 
Personal blog 
Old personal blog 

Japanese male film actors
Japanese male television actors
1991 births
Living people
People from Yurihonjō